The Accademia degli Apatisti was a scholarly society founded in Florence in 1635 and associated with the Florentine college known as the  Studio Fiorentino.

History
The academy was founded by Agostino Coltellini and Benedetto Fioretti under the patronage of Cosimo III de' Medici. It functioned in an environment of a number of other scholarly societies of the Accademia degli Umidi and the Accademia della Crusca. In 1783 The new Hapsburg-Lorraine Grand Duke, Leopold II fused this society with the Florentine University.

Among famous members are:
Carlo Roberto Dati (Ardaclito)
Ferdinando II de' Medici
Niccolò Stenone
Francesco Redi
Ansaldo Ansaldi
Lorenzo Magalotti
Mattia de Paoli
Giovanni Lami
Stefano della Bella
Vincenzo Viviani
Pietro Susini.

References

Bibliography
Francesco Adorno curator Accademie e istituzioni culturali in Toscana, Leo S. Olschki, Florence 1988.
Alessandro Lazzeri, Intellettuali e consenso nella Toscana del Seicento. L'accademia degli Apatisti, Giuffrè, Milan 1983

External Source
 

Florence